Michael Nesmith in Television Parts is a summer TV series run by NBC in 1985. It was a 30-minute comedy-variety series created by Michael Nesmith as a  continuation of his Grammy Award-winning video production Elephant Parts, and earlier series PopClips. The first episode was a stand-alone television special which aired on March 7, 1985. The following series premiered on June 14, 1985.

The show was a mix of music videos (by both Nesmith and others) mixed in with comedy sketches, commercial parodies, and general silliness. It was hosted by Nesmith himself, who also participated in many of the sketches. Television Parts also featured guest appearances by a number of comedians, including Martin Mull, Whoopi Goldberg, Jay Leno, Jerry Seinfeld, Bill Martin, The Funny Boys and Garry Shandling, whose appearance on the show was the seed for It's Garry Shandling's Show. One of the show's featured pieces, "Deep Thoughts by Jack Handey" was later picked up by Saturday Night Live.

The show was cancelled after 5 episodes. The last episode was 90 minutes, and ran in the "Saturday Night Live" time-slot.  It would return in 1985 as two separate home video releases on VHS and Betamax, Television Parts Home Companion and Dr. Duck's Super Secret All-Purpose Sauce. The first was a 40-minute compilation featuring the comedy skits and music by Michael Nesmith only. Dr. Duck's Super Secret All-Purpose Sauce was a 90-minute montage of sketch comedy with a variety of stars and music videos, with none by Nesmith. The stars included Bobcat Goldthwait, Ed Begley, Jr., Jimmy Buffett, Rosanne Cash, Whoopi Goldberg, Jay Leno, Jerry Seinfeld and Garry Shandling.

References

External links
 

NBC original programming
1985 American television series debuts
1985 American television series endings
1980s American variety television series
English-language television shows
Television series created by Michael Nesmith